Telioneura albapex is a moth in the subfamily Arctiinae. It was described by Herbert Druce in 1898. It is found in the northern Atlantic coast of South America in French Guiana.

References

Moths described in 1898
Arctiinae